Anthony Edward Pevec (April 16, 1925 – December 14, 2014) was a bishop of the Catholic Church in the United States.  He served as an auxiliary bishop of the Diocese of Cleveland in the state of Ohio from 1982-2002.

Biography
Pevec was born in Cleveland, where he graduated from St Mary's Seminary. He also graduated from John Carroll University, earning a  doctorate degree.  He was ordained a priest for the Diocese of Cleveland on April 29, 1950.

On April 13, 1982 Pope John Paul II named him the Titular Bishop of Mercia and Auxiliary Bishop of Cleveland.  He was consecrated as bishop by Bishop Anthony Michael Pilla of Cleveland on July 2, 1982.  The principal co-consecrators were Archbishop Joseph Bernadin of Cincinnati and Bishop William Michael Cosgrove of Belleville.

Pevec served the diocese as an auxiliary for nearly 19 years when Pope John Paul accepted his resignation on April 3, 2001. Bishop Pevec officially retired on September 1, 2002. 

Bishop Pevec died on Sunday, December 14, 2014, aged 89, at the Diocesan Center for Pastoral Leadership in Wickliffe, his place of residence.

References

1925 births
2014 deaths
Religious leaders from Cleveland
Roman Catholic Diocese of Cleveland
Saint Mary Seminary and Graduate School of Theology alumni
John Carroll University alumni
20th-century American Roman Catholic titular bishops